Lytten is an unincorporated community in Elliott County, Kentucky, United States.  It lies along Route 173 west of the city of Sandy Hook, the county seat of Elliott County.  Its elevation is 1,155 feet (352 m).

References

Unincorporated communities in Elliott County, Kentucky
Unincorporated communities in Kentucky